Benson Nana Yaw Oduro Boateng, popularly known as Funny Face, is a Ghanaian comedian, known for his role in TV3 Ghana's sitcom Chorkor Trotro. He is also known as SwagOn-Papa.

Career 
Funny Face's first appearance on the Night of 1010 Laughs was in 2010. It is believed that he made his breakthrough to comedy through this.

Funny Face played the role of driver's mate in the TV3 sitcom Chorkor tro tro, where he was known as Chemu before quitting, for reasons unknown. His role in Chorkor Trotro gave him much popularity. He has also performed at the comedy dubbed Night of 1018 laughs.

His interest in music made him work with hiplife artist Castro de Destroyer. He featured in Castro's Sweet Banana while Castro also featured in Funny Face's Odo Bekumi. Funny Face also appeared in Castro and Asamoah Gyan's Do The Dance, and Odo Pa.

He has also been helpful to Togolese international footballer Emmanuel Adebayor at his charity event. He also spearheaded the Vodafone Ghana Red Campaign.

Marriage life 
Comedian Benson Ohene Oduro Boateng, popularly known as Funny Face married his wife Madama Elizabeth Adjoa Ntim in 2014 at a private ceremony witnessed by very few family and friends. Two years later, Funny Face confirmed on social media that they have separated. Following the controversial breakup, Madame Elizabeth Adjoa Ntim confirmed that, Funny Face couldn't satisfy her in bed, "he lasts only 2-minutes"  - on the other hand, ‘funny face’, has revealed that his wife cheated on him, hence their divorce. Funny Face is now blessed with 3 children with his baba mama Vanessa after they met in 2019 Papa Kumasi linked them together.

Personal life 
Funny Face has twins who he has named after his mother and footballer friend Emmanuel Adebayor. The names of the twins are Ella and Bella.

Filmography
TV Series
 Chorkor Trotro
 Cow And Chicken

References

External links

Living people
Ghanaian comedians
Year of birth missing (living people)
Place of birth missing (living people)